Groovin' Blue is an album by saxophonist Curtis Amy and drummer Frank Butler recorded in late 1960 and early 1961 for the Pacific Jazz label.

Reception

In a review for AllMusic, critic David Szatmary states: "Another solid example of this neglected tenor man".

Track listing
All compositions by Curtis Amy
 "Gone Into It" - 6:15	
 "Annsome" - 8:35 	
 "Bobblin'" - 5:20 	
 "Groovin' Blue" - 8:15 	
 "Beautiful You" - 7:36 	
 "Very Frank" - 1:48

Personnel 
Curtis Amy - tenor saxophone
Frank Butler - drums
Carmell Jones - trumpet
Bobby Hutcherson - vibraphone
Frank Strazzeri - piano
Jimmy Bond - bass

References 

1961 albums
Pacific Jazz Records albums
Curtis Amy albums
Frank Butler (musician) albums